Matti may refer to:

 Matti (given name), people with the given name
 Matti (surname), people with the surname
 Matti, Karnataka, a village in India
 Matti: Hell Is for Heroes, a 2006 film about Matti Nykänen

See also 
 Masa (disambiguation)
 Mati (disambiguation)